Nicolas Mougin (born September 28, 1979 in Strasbourg) is a French professional vert skater. Mougin started skating when he was twelve years old in 1991 and turned professional in 2002. Mougin has won many competitions in his vert skating career. Since 2008, he his consultant in business transfert for the public compagny "La Chambre de Métiers d'Alsace" in France.

Best Tricks: Frontside Mute 720

Vert Competitions 
2019 World Championships - Vert: 2rd
2017 European Championships - Vert: 2rd
2016 European Championships - Vert: 1rd
2011 European Championships - Vert: 3rd
2006 ASA World Championships - Vert: 11th
2005 ASA Amateur World Championships - Vert: 1st
2004 ASA Washington Pro Championships - Vert: 5th
2003 France Championships - Vert: 1st
2002 France Championships - Vert: 1st

References

External links
rollernews.com
rollernews.com
rollernews.com
nacsms.forumactif.com
xsk8.de

1979 births
Living people
Vert skaters
X Games athletes